United States gubernatorial elections were held in 1915, in five states. Kentucky, Louisiana, Maryland and Mississippi held their gubernatorial elections in odd numbered years, every 4 years, preceding the United States presidential election year. Massachusetts elected its governors to a single-year term, switching to two years from the 1920 election.

Results

References

Notes 

 
November 1915 events